Ronald Frederick Lyon (February 15, 1908 – February 5, 1942) was a Canadian professional ice hockey player who played 36 regular season and 5 playoff games for the Philadelphia Quakers and Boston Bruins of the National Hockey League in the 1930–31 season. The rest of his career, which lasted from 1929 to 1938, was spent in different minor leagues. He was born in Portage la Prairie, Manitoba.

Career statistics

Regular season and playoffs

External links

1908 births
1942 deaths
Boston Bruins players
Boston Cubs players
Boston Tigers (CAHL) players
Canadian ice hockey left wingers
Ice hockey people from Manitoba
Philadelphia Quakers (NHL) players
Sportspeople from Portage la Prairie
Springfield Indians players
Windsor Bulldogs (1929–1936) players